"Diva" is a song by Norwegian hip-hop/rap duo Cir.Cuz from their debut studio album Alt I Sin Tid. It was released on 17 October 2011 as a digital download in Norway. The song peaked at number 20 on the Norwegian Singles Chart.

Music video
A music video to accompany the release of "Diva" was first released onto YouTube on 8 November 2011 at a total length of three minutes and six seconds. The video was directed by Frederic Esnault and produced by Eivind Taksrud.

Track listing

Chart performance

Release history

See also
 "Radio"

References

External links
Official website
Cir.Cuz on Facebook

2011 singles
Cir.Cuz songs
2011 songs